The olive tufted flycatcher or olive flycatcher (Mitrephanes olivaceus) is a species of bird in the family Tyrannidae. It is found in the Yungas of Peru and western Bolivia. Its natural habitat is subtropical or tropical moist montane forests.

References

olive tufted flycatcher
Birds of the Yungas
olive tufted flycatcher
olive tufted flycatcher
Taxonomy articles created by Polbot